The 1969 Polish Speedway season was the 1969 season of motorcycle speedway in Poland.

Individual

Polish Individual Speedway Championship
The 1969 Individual Speedway Polish Championship final was held on 12 October at Rybnik.

Golden Helmet
The 1969 Golden Golden Helmet organised by the Polish Motor Union (PZM) was the 1969 event for the league's leading riders.

Calendar

Final classification=
Note: Result from final score was subtracted with two the weakest events.

Junior Championship
 winner - Zdzisław Dobrucki

Silver Helmet
 winner - Jerzy Szczakiel

Team

Team Speedway Polish Championship
The 1969 Team Speedway Polish Championship was the 22nd edition of the Team Polish Championship. 

Stal Gorzów Wielkopolski ended the domination of KS ROW Rybnik by winning the gold medal. The team included Edward Jancarz, Andrzej Pogorzelski, Edmund Migoś and Jerzy Padewski.

First League

Second League

References

Poland Individual
Poland Team
Speedway
1969 in Polish speedway